Hannah Jo van der Westhuysen (born 26 August 1995) is an English actor. They began their career as a child actor on the CITV series The Fugitives (2005). More recently, they played Stella in the Netflix series Fate: The Winx Saga (2021–2022).

Early life and education
Van der Westhuysen was born in Hammersmith, West London to an English mother and a South African father and grew up in South West London. They hold dual citizenship. They  took a year-long foundation course at the LAMDA before going on to graduate with a Bachelor of Arts in Acting from Drama Centre London in 2018.

Personal Life 
Van Der Westhusyen uses they/them pronouns.

Filmography

Film

Television

Music videos
 "No Man's Land" (2015), Joss Stone

Stage

References

External links
 
 Hannah van der Westhuysen at Spotlight

Living people
1995 births
Actresses from London
Alumni of the Drama Centre London
British non-binary actors
English people of Afrikaner descent
English people of South African descent
People from Hammersmith
British podcasters
21st-century English actors